"Famous Hoes" is a single by American rapper NLE Choppa, released on December 10, 2019 along with a music video. The song was produced by CashMoneyAP, Alecto and Kai.

Composition
The chorus of the song finds NLE Choppa melodically reflecting over making his girlfriend famous and then being rejected by her. The outro of the song warns his enemies to not "pull up" on his street.

Charts

Certifications

References

2020 singles
2020 songs
NLE Choppa songs
Warner Records singles
Songs written by CashMoneyAP